Addis Ababa Bole International Airport  is an international airport in Addis Ababa, Ethiopia. The airport was formerly known as Haile Selassie I International Airport. It is the main hub of Ethiopian Airlines, the national airline that serves destinations in Ethiopia and throughout the African continent, as well as nonstop service to Asia, Europe, North America and South America. The airport is also the base of the Ethiopian Aviation Academy. As of June 2018, nearly 450 flights per day were departing from and arriving at the airport.

History
In 1960, Ethiopian Airlines realized the runway at Lidetta was too short for its new jet aircraft, the Boeing 720. Thus a new airport was built at Bole.

By December 1962 the new runway and control tower were operational. In 1997, an expansion plan was announced for the airport. This expansion was done in three phases:

 Phase One: Adding a parallel runway and expanding the old runway.
 Phase Two: Construction of a brand new terminal with a large parking area, a shopping complex and restaurants.
 Phase Three: Construction of the 38 m control tower (double the height of the previous one) and installation of new electrical and fire-fighting equipment.

The expanded old runway and the new runway are capable of handling the Boeing 747 and Airbus A340 aircraft. The new parallel runway is connected by five entrances and exits to the old runway, which serves as a taxiway. The terminal houses a high tech security and baggage handling system built on more than 43,000 square meters of land. The terminal also has banks and duty-free shops. The new control tower was built in between Terminal 1 and Terminal 2, replacing the old control tower.

In 2003, the new international passenger terminal was opened, making it one of Africa's largest airport passenger terminals. The new terminal is capable of handling about 3,000 passengers an hour. This project was worth a total of 1.05 billion birr ($130 million). At the time, the airport was one of a number of airport terminal constructions that have been underway in Ethiopia.

In 2006, a new cargo terminal and maintenance hangar was opened five months late. This was because of expanded specifications vastly to improve Ethiopian Airlines' handling capacity and needs. The facility can accommodate three to four aircraft at a time. This project was worth a total of 340 million birr. At the same time, the first Airbus A380 arrived at the airport to undertake tests to validate its Engine Alliance GP7200 engines' performance from high altitude airports. The airport is capable of accommodating the A380.

In 2010, the Ethiopian Airports Enterprise announced another expansion project worth $27.9 million at the airport. The project will include expansion of the aircraft parking capacity from 19 to 44 in order to accommodate heavier aircraft such as the Boeing 747 and Boeing 777. In the first phase of the project, 15 parking stands will be constructed and the remaining will be completed in the next phase. The expansion will help in easing air traffic congestion due to an increase in international travel. This would lead to the new expansion plan in 2012.

Expansion

Expansion of the passenger terminal, cargo space, hangar, the runway and construction of the hotel is currently being completed by Chinese state-owned companies.

The expansion work is being undertaken in two phases on an 80-hectare site. The first phase of the expansion work had enabled the airport to accommodate 15 additional aircraft, reducing traffic congestion at the airport. The second phase of the expansion work will enable the airport to service 10 additional aircraft. The airport will be able to service a total of 44 aircraft upon the completion of the expansion. The airport also plans to expand the apron which purportedly can solve the persistent aircraft parking problem it faces particularly during large international conferences.

In 2012, expansion of the new passenger terminal was announced. The outlay of this expansion was projected at $250 million. At the same time, a new ramp was completed and can now park 24 aircraft. Another ramp is being built for 14 more aircraft. At the same time, the first phase of expanding the taxiways and adding more aircraft parking was completed. Eventually, this will lead to the expansion of the terminal. This all falls in line with Ethiopian Airlines' plan, "Vision 2025".

According to the CEO of Ethiopian Airlines, the east wing of the newly expanded airport was expected to be operational by the end of June 2018. The whole expansion project was completed by the end of 2018, enabling the airport to accommodate up to 22 million passengers per year. As of 23 Jan 2020 the extension is still not fully completed. The new check in area and the elevated road to it are not yet open.

On 27 January 2019, Ethiopian Prime Minister Abiy Ahmed inaugurated the expansion to Terminal 2.

Further developments
The former Prime Minister Hailemariam Desalegn had purportedly given permission to build a new international airport in the town of Mojo, 65 kilometers south of the capital's current airport. The senior official at the Ethiopian Airport Enterprise said that the officials of the enterprise and the Ministry of Transport briefed the Prime Minister about the planned grand airport project. Two other sites are also options.

Facilities
The airport has two terminals with a total of 11 gates, plus more than 30 remote aircraft parking stands behind both Terminals. Terminal 1 has 4 gates and Terminal 2 has 7 gates. Terminal 1 serves Domestic and Regional flights for Ethiopian Airlines, EgyptAir, Qatar Airways, Sudan Airways, and Yemenia. Terminal 2 serves International flights and the rest of the airlines that serve the airport.

In 2012, Ethiopian Airlines opened the first phase of its Cloud Nine Business Class Lounge at Bole International Airport. This will provide premium travelers with modern facilities and amenities. The second phase of the lounge's construction will include a spa, private digital lockers for passengers to stow away their bags, and a traditional Ethiopian coffee corner. Once complete, it will be three times the size of the existing lounge. Cloud Nine features a quiet corner with sleeping cots and individual reading lamps, massage chairs, and an internet corner with free Wi-Fi connection. The lounge is part of the airline's "Vision 2025 Fast Growth Plan".

In 2017, Ethiopian Airlines Group announced that it signed $350 million contract with China Communications Construction to build a new hub, a part of which will be open to the public no later than June 2018.

Airlines and destinations

Passenger

: Some of these flights make a stopover at Dublin for refueling. However, Ethiopian Airlines does not sell tickets solely between Addis Ababa and Dublin, nor between Dublin and Atlanta, Chicago–O’Hare, Toronto–Pearson, and Washington–Dulles.

Cargo

Statistics

Accidents and incidents
On 18 April 1972 at 09:40, an East African Airways Super VC-10 (registered 5X-UVA) crashed during take-off; 35 passengers killed, as well as 8 of 11 crew. 13 injured, 48 uninjured.
On 18 March 1980, Douglas C-47B ET-AGM of Ethiopian Airlines crashed while on a single-engined approach to Bole International Airport. The aircraft was on a training flight.
On 10 March 2019, a Boeing 737 MAX 8 of Ethiopian Airlines operating as Ethiopian Airlines Flight 302 bound for Nairobi crashed shortly after takeoff from Bole International Airport, killing all 157 people (149 passengers and 8 crew members) on board. This crash was very similar to the crash of Lion Air Flight 610 five months earlier, as both planes were brand new 737 MAX's that crashed right after takeoff. Together, these two crashes led to the worldwide grounding of the Boeing 737 MAX for nearly 2 years.

See also
List of airports in Ethiopia
List of the busiest airports in Africa

References

External links

Airports in Ethiopia
Bole Airport
Bole Airport